Robert Alan Cassevah (born September 11, 1985) is an American former professional baseball pitcher. He played in Major League Baseball (MLB) for the Los Angeles Angels of Anaheim.

Early life and amateur career
Cassevah grew up in Pace, Florida where he was youth teammates with Josh Donaldson and P. J. Walters. Cassevah attended Pace High School where he was named all-state as a sophomore and junior. A football-related injury required him to undergo Tommy John surgery and miss his senior baseball season. He was highly regarded as a college baseball recruit and had verbally committed to play at Louisiana State on a full scholarship.

Professional career

Los Angeles Angels of Anaheim
He was drafted in the 34th round of the 2004 amateur draft by the Anaheim Angels out of Pace High School.

Cassevah began his professional career in 2005 with the AZL Angels. With them, he went 2–5 with a 5.40 ERA in 15 games (4 starts). He pitched for the Orem Owlz in 2006, going 2–5 with a 6.80 ERA in 16 games (10 starts).

He became a reliever in 2007 and performed well, going 2–1 with a 2.75 ERA in 24 combined relief appearances for the Orem Owlz and Cedar Rapids Kernels. In 2008, he went 2–3 with a 3.79 ERA in 44 relief appearances for the Rancho Cucamonga Quakes. He went 3–7 with a 3.68 ERA in 57 relief appearances for the Arkansas Travelers in 2009.

Oakland Athletics
On December 10, 2009, the Athletics drafted him from the Angels in the Rule V Draft.

Second stint with the Angels
On March 15, 2010, the Athletics offered Cassevah back to the Los Angeles Angels of Anaheim who accepted him back.

On June 13, 2011, Cassevah was recalled from AAA Salt Lake to replace the injured Fernando Rodney. He has pitched an impressive 2.72 ERA in 30 appearances in the 2011 season.

On February 28, 2013, Cassevah was outrighted by the Angels and removed from the 40-man roster. On March 1, 2013, he refused an outright assignment to AAA and became a free agent.

Colorado Rockies
On March 2, 2013, he signed a minor league contract with the Colorado Rockies. On March 23, 2014, the Rockies released Cassevah.

Pitch types
Cassevah was mainly a sinkerballer (90–94), with a slider to righties and a changeup to lefties as off-speed pitches.

See also
Rule 5 draft results

References

External links

1985 births
Living people
Los Angeles Angels players
Major League Baseball pitchers
Arizona League Angels players
Orem Owlz players
Cedar Rapids Kernels players
Rancho Cucamonga Quakes players
Arkansas Travelers players
Salt Lake Bees players
Inland Empire 66ers of San Bernardino players
Baseball players from Florida
Colorado Springs Sky Sox players
People from Santa Rosa County, Florida
Scottsdale Scorpions players